The Men's Road Race event at the 2010 South American Games was held at 12:30 on March 22.

Medalists

Results
Race distance: 73.2 km

References
Report

Road Race M
2010 in road cycling